Cewlino  is a village in the administrative district of Gmina Manowo, within Koszalin County, West Pomeranian Voivodeship, in north-western Poland.

See also
History of Pomerania

References

Cewlino